Anna Karin Eneström is a Swedish diplomat who has been serving as the Swedish Permanent Representative to the United Nations, having presented her credentials on January 6, 2020. She had been Deputy Permanent Representative since 2019.

Early life and education
Eneström earned a Master of Laws degree from the University of Uppsala.

Career
Previously in her career, Eneström served as Representative to the Political and Security Committee at the Permanent Representation of Sweden to the European Union in Brussels.

Eneström was Special Envoy to Afghanistan and Pakistan in 2009 after having served as Ambassador to those countries in 2007.

Other activities
 International Gender Champions (IGC), Member
 International Peace Institute (IPI), Member of the International Advisory Council

See also 

 Sweden and the United Nations

References

Swedish women ambassadors
Permanent Representatives of Sweden to the United Nations
Ambassadors of Sweden to Afghanistan
Ambassadors of Sweden to Pakistan
Uppsala University alumni
Year of birth missing (living people)
Living people
21st-century Swedish women